The discography of Letlive, an American rock, consists of four studio albums, one extended play (EP), four singles and seven music videos. Letlive was formed in Los Angeles, California in 2002 and released its debut EP Exhaustion, Salt Water, and Everything in Between on At One Records the following year. In 2005, the band released its full-length debut album Speak Like You Talk. After a number of lineup changes, the group signed with Tragic Hero Records and released its second studio album Fake History in 2010.

In 2011, Letlive signed with Epitaph Records and reissued Fake History with a number of additional tracks. After more lineup changes, in 2013 the band released third album The Blackest Beautiful, which was well received by critics. The album also gave the group its first experience of chart success, reaching number 62 on the UK Albums Chart. 2016's follow-up, If I'm the Devil..., charted in the United States and the United Kingdom, as well as in Australia, Germany and New Zealand for the first time in the band's career.

Studio albums

Extended plays

Demos

Singles

Music videos

References

External links
Letlive official website
Letlive discography at AllMusic
Letlive discography at Discogs
Letlive discography at MusicBrainz

Discographies of American artists
Post-hardcore group discographies